Haripalem is a village and panchayat of Achutapuram mandal, Anakapalli district, Andhra Pradesh, India.

References 

Villages in Anakapalli district